Emma Ritch (8 December 1976 – 9 July 2021) was a Scottish women's rights campaigner who was the executive director of Engender, a feminist policy organisation working on women’s social, economic, and political equality in Scotland. She had been working there for 13 years when she died on 9 July 2021.

Career 
Ritch was a graduate of  English Language and Literature at Glasgow University and a well known activist, campaigner and author. She had a masters degree in IT and management.

She worked as an advisor to the Scottish Government on equality issues. She was a member of the Scottish Government's  First Minister's Advisory Council on Women & Girls. She was on the joint strategic board of Equally Safe, and the advisory group of the Scottish Women’s Rights Centre. Ritch became Chair of Rape Crisis Scotland board in 2016 and Chair of the Board of Trustees of the board of the Human Rights Consortium Scotland in 2020. She sat on the equality advisory groups of Skills Development Scotland, was a member of the YWCA Glasgow board for eight years, and served a four-year term on the GMB union's National Equality Forum. She was a board member of the European Women's Lobby. As a women's rights campaigner Ritch advocated an inclusive feminism and was known for her intersectional approach and support for LGBT rights; she had a particular interest in the relation between equality policies and human rights; under her leadership Engender became "the authoritative voice on women’s unpaid care work, the devastating effect of austerity and the need for a social security system that meets the needs of women’s lives, hate crime, equal representation in politics, and access to safe, legal abortion healthcare."

On her death, Ritch's career and voluntary work was described as 'dedicated to realising women's equality and rights' and Engender considered her 'hugely influential in the movement in Scotland'. The First Minister of Scotland, Nicola Sturgeon called her 'a force for good - a passionate advocate for women's rights and a champion of justice and equality.'  The Icelandic women's rights association Kvenrettindafelags Islands said she was a 'kind, brilliant and fiercely feminist voice for change in Europe.'

References 

1976 births
2021 deaths
Scottish feminists
British activists
Equality rights
Alumni of the University of Glasgow